The 2009–10 FIS Ski Jumping World Cup was the 31st World Cup season in ski jumping and the 13th official World Cup season in ski flying. It started on 26 November 2009 at the Rukatunturi ski jumping hill in Kuusamo, Finland and finished on 14 March 2010 at Holmenkollen, Norway.

Map of world cup hosts 
All 17 locations which have been hosting World Cup events for men this season. Events in Harrachov and Trondheim were canceled.Oberstdorf hosted FIS Team Tour and four hills tournament. Lillehammer hosted events on large hill for two different times.

 Four Hills Tournament
 Nordic Tournament
 FIS Team Tour (Oberstdorf ski flying events included)

Calendar

Men

Men's team

Schedule changes 
 On 27 November 2009, it was announced by the FIS that 5–6 December 2009 events were moved from Trondheim to Lillehammer because of warm weather and lack of snow in Trondheim.
 On 4 December 2009, it was announced by FIS that 12–13 December 2009 events in Harrachov were cancelled to warm weather and lack of snow. By 6 December 2009, a possibility that one ski jumping and one Nordic combined World Cup event could take place in Harrachov on 15–16 December 2009. A decision will be made on 9 December 2009 at 1200 CET. By 8 December 2009, one of the Harrachov rounds was rescheduled for 18 December 2009 in Engelberg.

Individual World Cup 
 The jumper highlighted in yellow was the leader of the World Cup at the time of the competition and wore the yellow jersey.
 The jumper highlighted in azure was the leader of the Nordic Tournament at the time of the competition and wore the blue jersey.
 The jumper highlighted in gold was the leader of the Four Hills Tournament at the time of the competition and wore the gold jersey.

Kuusamo 
 HS142 Rukatunturi, Finland
 28 November 2009

Notes:
 Gregor Schlierenzauer wore the yellow jersey as the reigning champion.

Trondheim/Lillehammer 

 The events was moved to Lillehammer due to warm weather and lack of snow in Trondheim.
 HS138 Lysgårdsbakken, Norway
5 December 2009

 HS138 Lysgårdsbakken, Norway
6 December 2009

Notes:
 Simon Ammann set a new hill record of 146.0 meters in the first round.
 In the first round Gregor Schlierenzauer jumped 150.5 meters but fell at the landing so the record did not count.

Harrachov 
 K-120 Čerťák, Czech Republic
12 December 200913 December 2009

Notes:
*The competitions cancelled due to warm temperatures and lack of snow.

Engelberg 

 HS 137 Gross-Titlis-Schanze, Switzerland
18 December 2009

This competition replaces the cancelled competitions at Harrachov (see above).

 HS 137 Gross-Titlis-Schanze, Switzerland
19 December 2009

 HS 137 Gross-Titlis-Schanze, Switzerland
20 December 2009

Notes:
 In the first round Simon Ammann equalled the hill record of 141.0 meters set by Janne Ahonen in 2004
 The final round was cancelled due to poor weather conditions

Four Hills Tournament

Oberstdorf 

 HS 137 Schattenbergschanze, Germany
29 December 2009

Garmisch Partenkirchen 

 HS140 Große Olympiaschanze, Germany
1 January 2010

Notes
 As Andreas Kofler was the leader of the Four Hills Tournament, he wore the golden FHT-leader jersey
 Simon Ammann set a new hill record of 143.5 meters

Innsbruck 

 HS130 Bergiselschanze, Austria
3 January 2010

Bischofshofen 
 HS 140 Paul-Ausserleitner-Schanze, Austria
6 January 2010

Tauplitz/Bad Mitterndorf 
 HS 200 Kulm, Austria
9 January 2010 

 HS 200 Kulm, Austria
10 January 2010

Sapporo 
 HS134 Mt. Okura Ski Jump Stadium, Japan
16 January 2010 

Notes
 World Cup leader Gregor Schlierenzauer did not take part in this competition

 HS134 Mt. Okura Ski Jump Stadium, Japan
17 January 2010

Zakopane 
 HS134 Wielka Krokiew, Poland
 22 January 2010 

 HS134 Wielka Krokiew, Poland
 23 January 2010 

Notes
 Simon Ammann set a new hill record of 140.5 meters in the first round

Oberstdorf 
 HS213 Heini-Klopfer-Skiflugschanze, Germany
31 January 2010

Klingenthal 
 HS140 Vogtlandarena, Germany
3 February 2010

Willingen 
 HS145 Mühlenkopfschanze, Germany
6 February 2010

Notes
 World Cup leader Simon Ammann did not take part in this competition

Nordic Tournament

Lahti 
 HS134 Salpausselkä, Finland
7 March 2010

Kuopio 
 HS127 Puijo, Finland
9 March 2010

Notes
 As Simon Ammann was both the Nordic Tournament leader and overall World Cup leader the blue jersey was not worn

Lillehammer 
 HS138 Lysgårdsbakken, Norway
12 March 2010

Notes
 With one event remaining Simon Ammann won the 2010 Ski Jumping World Cup

Oslo 
 HS134 Holmenkollen, Norway
14 March 2010

Notes
 Andreas Kofler set a new hill record of 139.5 meters

Team World Cup

Kuusamo 

 HS142 Rukatunturi, Finland
27 November 2009

Oberstdorf 
 HS213 Heini-Klopfer-Skiflugschanze, Germany
30 January 2010

Notes
 Robert Kranjec jumped 226.0 meters but fell before the outrun line so the record wasn't kept

Willingen 
 HS145 Mühlenkopfschanze, Germany
7 February 2010

Notes
 The normal Austrian team did not participate as they were on their way to the 2010 Winter Olympics in Vancouver. All four members of the teams from both Germany and Norway competed in Vancouver.

Lahti 
 HS130 Salpausselkä, Finland
6 March 2010

Notes
 Due to poor wind conditions the second round was cancelled

World Cup Standings

Overall Top 30 (individual) 

Full points table
Full results table

Key:

Nation Cup

References 

World cup
World cup
FIS Ski Jumping World Cup